Case Broderick (September 23, 1839 – April 1, 1920) was a politician and U.S. Representative from Kansas. He was a cousin of David Colbreth Broderick, of Washington, DC; New York, and California; and Andrew Kennedy of California, who also became national politicians.

Early life, education and marriage
Case Broderick was born in 1839 near Marion, Indiana, a son of Samuel Broderick and Mary (Snider or Snyder) Broderick.  Broderick attended the common schools in Indiana.

He moved at age 19 to Holton, Kansas, in 1858 and engaged in agricultural pursuits. Case Broderick married Mary A. Ewbank on August 23, 1860 in Jackson County, Kansas Territory.  Mary was born in Dearborn County in Southeast Indiana, May 12, 1831.

During the Civil War, Broderick enlisted as a private in the Kansas 2nd Light Artillery Battery 27 May 1863 and was mustered out at Leavenworth 11 August 1865.

He studied law with an established firm and was admitted to the bar in 1870, starting his practice in Holton, Kansas. He joined the Republican Party was elected as mayor of Holton in 1874 and 1875. He served as prosecuting attorney of Jackson County from 1876-1880.

Political career
Broderick was elected to two terms in the Kansas Senate, serving 1880-1884.

In March 1884 he was appointed by President Chester A. Arthur as an associate justice of the Supreme Court of the Territory of Idaho and moved to Boise City, Idaho. He served until the fall of 1888, when he returned to Holton, Kansas, and resumed the practice of law.  His wife, Mary, died November 13, 1888.

Broderick was elected as a Republican to the Fifty-second and to the three succeeding Congresses (March 4, 1891 – March 3, 1899).

He was an unsuccessful candidate for renomination in 1898.  He again engaged in the practice of law in Holton, Kansas.  Retiring from the practice of law, he devoted his time to farming and livestock interests.  He died in Holton, April 1, 1920.  He was interred in Holton Cemetery.

References

1839 births
1920 deaths
Kansas lawyers
Kansas state senators
People from Holton, Kansas
People of Kansas in the American Civil War
People from Grant County, Indiana
Idaho Territory judges
Mayors of places in Kansas
People from Marion, Indiana
Union Army soldiers
Idaho Republicans
Republican Party members of the United States House of Representatives from Kansas
19th-century American lawyers